National Secondary Route 210, or just Route 210 (or ) is a National Road Route of Costa Rica, located in the San José province.

Description
In San José province the route covers Desamparados canton (San Antonio district), Curridabat canton (Curridabat, Tirrases districts).

References

Highways in Costa Rica